Jay Lamoureux  (born 13 August 1995) is a Canadian male road and track cyclist, representing Canada at international competitions. He won the silver medal at the 2016 Pan American Track Cycling Championships in the individual pursuit and the team pursuit.

As an under-23 rider he won the bronze medal at the Canadian National Road Race Championships.

He has qualified to represent Canada at the 2020 Summer Olympics.

Major results

2014
 3rd National Under-23 Road Race Championships
2015
 3rd National Individual Pursuit Championships
2016
 Pan American Track Championships
2nd Individual pursuit
2nd Team pursuit
 1st Apeldoorn World Cup Team Pursuit
2018
 3rd Commonwealth Games Team Pursuit 
 3rd Berlin, GER World Cup Team Pursuit 
2019
 2nd Cambridge, NZ World Cup Team Pursuit
 4th Pruszkow, POL World Championships Team Pursuit

References

External links

1995 births
Living people
Canadian male cyclists
Canadian track cyclists
Place of birth missing (living people)
Cyclists at the 2018 Commonwealth Games
Commonwealth Games medallists in cycling
Commonwealth Games bronze medallists for Canada
Olympic cyclists of Canada
Cyclists at the 2020 Summer Olympics
Cyclists from British Columbia
Sportspeople from Victoria, British Columbia
21st-century Canadian people
Medallists at the 2018 Commonwealth Games